Engraulicypris ngalala is a species of cyprinid in the genus Engraulicypris. It inhabits the Rovuma River in Mozambique and Lake Chiuta in Malawi. It has a maximum length of 5.1 cm (2.0 inches).

References

Cyprinidae
Cyprinid fish of Africa
Fish of Malawi
Fish of Mozambique